The Anglo-Ethiopian Society's stated goal is  "to foster knowledge of Ethiopian culture, history and way of life and to encourage friendship between the British and Ethiopian peoples." The society was founded in November 1948 by Professor Norman Bentwich.  The famed English economist Sir George Paish served for a time as co-president of the society.

References

United Kingdom friendship associations
1948 establishments in the United Kingdom
Organizations established in 1948
Ethiopia–United Kingdom relations